Jacques Doucet may refer to:

 Jacques Doucet (fashion designer) (1853–1929), French fashion designer 
 Jacques Doucet (sportscaster) (born 1940), French-Canadian sportscaster for the Montreal Expos
 Jacques Doucet (sailor), French sailor who competed in the 1900 Summer Olympics
  (1924–1994), French surrealist painter